Laura Parker is an American installation, drawing and photographic artist.

In Parker's traveling, ongoing installation A Taste of Place, participants breathe the smell of soils and taste food from the corresponding farms. These events are designed to "connect the smell of the earth to the flavour of foods grown in it".

In 2010, Parker collaborated with the Robert Mondavi Winery to present her A Taste of Place installation at the restaurant Saison in San Francisco's Mission District. The invitations for the event included a box of soil from Mondavi's Kalon Vineyard.

Parker's drawings are featured on the walls of the San Anselmo restaurant Insalata's, and in the pages of Heidi Krahling's book Insalata's Mediterranean Table.

References

American installation artists
American photographers
Place of birth missing (living people)
Year of birth missing (living people)
American women artists
Living people
21st-century American women